Randi Luther Pereira-Patterson (born 16 April 1985), known as Randi Patterson, is an American-born Trinidadian footballer who plays as a forward. He has been a member of the Trinidad and Tobago national team.

College career
Patterson spent four seasons at the University of North Carolina at Greensboro, where he was a two-time Southern Conference Player of the Year and National Soccer Coaches Association of America All-American selection. He finished his college career with 61 goals and 19 assists. Patterson grew up in Teaneck, New Jersey, raised by his mother after his father was killed in a car accident when he was two years old, and attended Bergen Catholic High School in Oradell, New Jersey, whom he led to the 1999 state championship. During his college years he also played with Carolina Dynamo of the USL Premier Development League, scoring 15 goals in his 14 games in 2006.

Club career
New York Red Bulls selected Patterson with its first round pick in the 2007 MLS Supplemental Draft in January 2007. He was waived on February 18, 2008.

In March 2008, he scored on his debut for Charleston Battery against Toronto FC in the Carolina Challenge Cup  In the fall of 2008, he joined the Chicago Storm of the Xtreme Soccer League, and played for them during the outdoor offseason, before re-joining Charleston prior to the 2009 USL1 season.

International career
Patterson's father, Earl Pereira, was born in Trinidad, Trinidad and Tobago. He made his debut for the Soca Warriors in a March 2008 friendly match against El Salvador.

Career statistics
(correct as of 26 July 2010)

References

External links
Charleston Battery bio
MLS player profile

1985 births
Living people
Citizens of Trinidad and Tobago through descent
Trinidad and Tobago footballers
Association football forwards
Trinidad and Tobago international footballers
North Carolina Fusion U23 players
Chicago Storm players
New York Red Bulls players
Charleston Battery players
Crystal Palace Baltimore players
Austin Aztex FC players
USL League Two players
USL First Division players
USSF Division 2 Professional League players
Bergen Catholic High School alumni
Sportspeople from Hackensack, New Jersey
People from Teaneck, New Jersey
UNC Greensboro Spartans men's soccer players
New York Red Bulls draft picks
Soccer players from New Jersey
All-American men's college soccer players
American soccer players
African-American soccer players
American sportspeople of Trinidad and Tobago descent